Wacko is a 1983 arcade game by Bally Midway.

Wacko may also refer to:

 Wacko (behavior)
 Wacko (film), a 1982 American horror film parody
 Wacko (TV series), a short-lived 1977 American variety television series
 A villain in the Disney animated series Darkwing Duck
 A member of the American rap group UTP
 Rob "Wacko" Hunter, a former member of the British band Raven
 A song on the album Carpe Diem

See also
Whack-O!, a British television sitcom
Wacky (disambiguation)
 Wakko, one of the three siblings in the American animated television series Animaniacs
Psycho (disambiguation)